Marcos Nikolas Bolados Hidalgo (born 28 February 1996) is a Chilean footballer that currently plays for Primera División club Colo-Colo.

International career
Along with Chile U20, he won the L'Alcúdia Tournament in 2015.

Bolados was named in Chile's provisional squad for Copa América Centenario but was cut from the final squad.

He scored the winning goal on his Chile debut as they won 2-1 against Sweden on March 24, 2018.

International goals
Scores and results list Chile's goal tally first.

Honors
Colo-Colo
Primera División (1): Transición 2017
Copa Chile: 2016
Supercopa de Chile: 2017

Universidad Católica
 Primera División de Chile (1): 2018

Chile U20
 L'Alcúdia International Tournament (1): 2015

References

External links
 

1996 births
Living people
People from Antofagasta
Chilean footballers
Chile under-20 international footballers
Chile international footballers
Colo-Colo footballers
C.D. Antofagasta footballers
Club Deportivo Universidad Católica footballers
Chilean Primera División players
Association football wingers